Adele Faccio (13 November 1920 – 8 February 2007) was an Italian politician and deputy of the Radical Party (Partito Radicale). She was an advocate for sexual and reproductive rights, striving to give women the choice of whether or not to reproduce.

Abortion activism
She founded the Information Centre on Sterilisation and Abortion (Centro d'Informazione sulla Sterilizzazione e sull'Aborto) in 1973.

She wrote articles for "La vie femminile" regarding abortion and exploitation of women.

Notes and references

1920 births
2007 deaths
People from Pontebba
Radical Party (Italy) politicians
Rainbow Greens politicians
Deputies of Legislature VII of Italy
Deputies of Legislature VIII of Italy
Deputies of Legislature X of Italy
Politicians of Friuli-Venezia Giulia
Italian abortion-rights activists
Italian women's rights activists
20th-century Italian women politicians
Women activists
Women members of the Chamber of Deputies (Italy)